Crickstart Food Co. is a Canadian insect food company that produces organic cricket-based food products, headquartered in Montreal, Quebec.

Company History 
Crickstart was founded in 2016. In May 2018 Crickstart launched its products in the US market while at the Sweets & Snacks Expo in Chicago.

Products 
The company produces energy and protein bars made with cricket flour.

Reception 

In a review of the Crickstart cinnamon cardamom bar for La Presse, food reviewer Marie Allard highlighted its “quality ingredients” such as hemp, seed butters, dates, and coconut sugar, citing that the bar provides “260 calories, 16 g of fat, 10 g of sugar, and 12 g of protein.”

In an article for the Globe and Mail, journalist Corey Mintz mentions Crickstart as one of the companies that are “lining up to sell insects [...] as an environmentally friendly cure-all.” However, the article argues that the "solution narrative - the marketing of insects as a panacea for health, resource and climate challenges - is misleading.”
However, CEO Daniel Novak explained to Mintz that “other agricultural industries are heavily automated and apply massive economies of scale… As people purchase these products, production volumes increase and new entrants come into the industry, prices will be driven down over the coming years.”

References

External links 
 Crickstart official site
 Crickstart Canada official site

Insect food companies
Manufacturing companies based in Montreal
Food and drink companies based in Montreal
Food and drink companies established in 2016
Canadian companies established in 2016
2016 establishments in Quebec